The 2015 NHRA Mello Yello Drag Racing Season was announced on August 25, 2014.

There were 24 Top Fuel, Funny Car, and Pro Stock car events, and 16 Pro Stock Motorcycle events scheduled.

Schedule

NOTE: All races will be televised on ESPN or ESPN2. This will be ESPN's last year televising the NHRA. Fox Sports will take over the rights in 2016.
1 The rules for the 4-Wide Nationals differ from other races:
 All cars will qualify on each lane as all four lanes will be used in qualifying.
 Three rounds with cars using all four lanes.
 In Rounds One and Two, the top two drivers (of four) will advance to the next round.
 The pairings are set as follows:
 Race One: 1, 8, 9, 16
 Race Two: 4, 5, 12, 13
 Race Three: 2, 7, 10, 15
 Race Four: 3, 6, 11, 14
 Semifinal One: Top two in Race One and Race Two
 Semifinal Two: Top two in Race Three and Race Four
 Finals: Top two in Semifinal One and Semifinal Two
 Lane choice determined by times in previous round.  In first round, lane choice determined by fastest times.
 Drivers who advance in Rounds One and Two will receive 20 points for each round advancement.
 In Round Three, the winner of the race will be declared the race winner and will collect 40 points.  The runner-up will receive 20 points.  Third and fourth place drivers will be credited as semifinal losers.

Notable events
 The Qatar Racing Club terminated funding for all motorsports activities in North America, leaving the 2015 season plans for the Al-Anabi Racing Team in question.
 John Force Racing announced a multi-year agreement with General Motors to race under the Chevrolet brand. The team has also secured a Primary Sponsorship on John Force's car, and an Associate Sponsorship on his other cars from Peak Antifreeze and BlueDEF.
  NHRA and ESPN mutually agreed to end their television coverage agreement following the 2015 season. The 2016 season was to be the final year of a five-year rights extension deal that took effect in 2012.

Final standings

References

External links
 Official website
 Official NHRA Drag Racing Podcasts
 Drag Race Central The Latest NHRA News and Analysis

NHRA Camping World Drag Racing Series
2015 in American motorsport